Emmy Heil Frensel-Wegener (14 June 1901 in Amsterdam – 11 January 1973 in Laren (North Holland) was a Dutch violinist, pianist, poet and composer.

Life and career 
Wegener was the daughter of composer Bertha Frensel Wegener-Koopman and American insurance agent John Frensel-Wegener. She studied at the music school in Bussum and then in England, then continued her studies at the Conservatory in Amsterdam where she received a degree in violin with Felice Togni. She also studied composition with Sem Dresden, clarinet with Willem Brohm and Gregorian chant.

In 1926 Wegener married Jan Heil, but the couple divorced in 1932. In 1934 she served on the jury for the evaluation of vocal quartet a cappella compositions for the Dutch Association for Contemporary Music, along with Hendrik Andriessen, Henk Badings, Anthon van der Horst and Daniel Ruyneman, but the jury awarded no first prize, finding no "composition of exemplary meaning" among the 47 submissions.

In 1935 Wegener experienced a serious illness that progressed to paralysis by 1950. She wrote at least one poem which appeared in De Nieuwe Gids. The city of Gorinchem named a street after her.

Works 
Wegener composed works for orchestra, chamber ensemble, piano and voice, which The New Grove described as "in a dissonant, neo-classical style." Her works date mainly from 1925 to 1935, when illness reduced her output. Selected works include:

1925: Sonate
1925: Suite voor twee violen
1926: Hobosuite (ooit uitgevoerd door Jaap Stotijn en Gerard Hengelveld)
1927: Sonate in een deel voor cello en piano
1927: Sextet (fluit, hobo, klarinet, fagot, hoorn en piano)
1928: Ik zag Cecilia voor zangstem en begeleiding
1928: Gekwetst ben ik voor drie sopranen, twee alten, twee tenoren en twee bassen
1929: Suite voor orkest
1929: Drie stukken voor viool en piano
1929: Strijkkwartet
1929: Menuetto voor hobo en piano
1930: Rapsodie voor piano en orkest
1930: Twee stukken voor piano solo
Suite voor klarinet en piano, dat tot in Boedapest te horen is geweest
Toccata voor piano solo
1929: Dans voor klarinet en orkest, uitgevoerd in Geneve onder leiding van Ernest Ansermet tijdens het ISCM
1932: Shakespeare-suite, op 7 februari 1932 uitgevoerd door het Concertgebouworkest onder leiding van Pierre Monteux.
1949: Donumus

References 

Emmy Frensel Wegener at nl.muziekencyclopedie.nl

1901 births
1973 deaths
Dutch women classical composers
Dutch classical composers
Dutch classical violinists
20th-century classical composers
Musicians from Amsterdam
Conservatorium van Amsterdam alumni
20th-century classical violinists
Women classical violinists
20th-century women composers